These are the official results of the Men's Javelin Throw event at the 1992 Summer Olympics in Barcelona, Spain. There were a total number of 32 participating athletes. The final was held on August 8, 1992, and the qualifying round on August 7, 1992, with the qualification mark set at 80.00 metres.

Medalists

Schedule

Abbreviations
All results shown are in metres

Records

Qualification

Group A

Group B

Final

See also
 1990 Men's European Championships Javelin Throw (Split)
 1991 Men's World Championship Javelin Throw
 1992 Javelin Throw Year Ranking
 1993 Men's World Championships Javelin Throw (Stuttgart)
 1994 Men's European Championships Javelin Throw (Helsinki)

References

External links
 Official Report
 Results
 koti.welho

J
Javelin throw at the Olympics
Men's events at the 1992 Summer Olympics